Jessica Pratt (born 9 October 1997) is an American-born Australian professional racing cyclist, who most recently rode for UCI Women's WorldTeam .

Outside of cycling, Pratt is a registered nurse.

Major results

2014
 Oceania Junior Road Championships
2nd  Road race
5th Time trial
2015
 1st  Road race, National Junior Road Championships
 Oceania Junior Road Championships
3rd  Road race
4th Time trial
 9th Road race, UCI Junior Road World Championships
2017
 1st Stage 5 Tour Cycliste Féminin International de l'Ardèche
 4th Road race, Oceania Road Championships
2020
 9th Overall Women's Tour Down Under

References

External links
 

1997 births
Living people
Australian female cyclists
Australian women nurses
Australian nurses
People from Greenville, Michigan